The Yao people (or WaYao) are a major Bantu ethnic and linguistic group based at the southern end of Lake Malawi. They played an important role in the history of Southeast Africa, notably in the 19th century. The Yao are a predominantly Muslim-faith group of about two million, whose homelands encompass the countries of Malawi, the north of Mozambique, and the Ruvuma and Mtwara Regions of Tanzania. The Yao have a strong cultural identity, transcending national borders.

History

The majority of Yao are subsistence farmers and fishermen. When Arabs arrived on the southeastern coast of Africa, they began trading with the Yao people for ivory and grains, exchanged for clothes and weapons. Due to their involvement in this coastal trade, they became one of the richest and most influential tribes in Southern Africa. Large Yao kingdoms came into being, as Yao chiefs took control of the Niassa province of Mozambique in the 19th century. During that time, the Yao began to move from their traditional home to today's Malawi and Tanzania, which resulted in the Yao populations present today. One of the most important milestones for the chiefdoms was the conversion of the entire nation to Islam. In 1870, Makanjila III (one of the Mangochi Yao chiefs of the Nyasa area) adopted Islam as his personal and court religion. 

Subsequently, through business relations with Arab and Swahili traders, the Yao chiefs (who called themselves “sultans”) needed scribes who were literate; thus, Islamic teachers were employed. Within the Yao villages, these scribes had a significant impact on the people, offering not only literacy but the social, religious and economic benefits of the Muslim coastal areas. Furthermore, the Yao sultans strongly resisted Portuguese, British, and German colonial rule, which was viewed as a major cultural, political and economic (as well as personal) threat. The British tried to stop the ivory and slave trade, attacking some of the Yao trade caravans near the coast. The Yao chief Mataka rejected Christianity, as Islam offered them a social system which would seamlessly assimilate their traditional culture. With the prominence of the chiefs turning to Islam, their conversion influenced their subjects to do likewise. The folk Islam which the Yao people have embraced is syncretized with their traditional, animistic belief systems.

In Mozambique
The Yao originally lived in northern Mozambique (formerly Portuguese East Africa); A close look at the history of the Yao people, in Mozambique as a whole, shows that their ethno-geographic center was located in a small village called Chiconono, in the northwestern province of Niassa. The majority of Yao were mainly subsistence farmers, but some were also active as ivory and slave traders. They faced social and political strife with Portugal’s arrival (in today's Niassa Province) and subsequent establishment of the Niassa Company. These Portuguese settlers took up residence in the region, founding cities and towns. In the process, they systematically destroyed the indigenous, independent farm-and-trade system and changed it to a plantation-based economy, under Portuguese authority. The expanding Portuguese Empire had their own well-established trading posts, forts and ports in East Africa from the 15th century; this was in direct competition with the hugely-influential Muslim political forces of Somali, Swahili, the Ottomans, Mughals and Yemeni Sufi orders (to a limited extent), plus the increasing Ibadi influences (from independent Southeastern Arabia). The spice route and Christian evangelization were the main driving forces behind Portuguese expansion in the region. However, later in the 19th century, the Portuguese were also involved in a large slave trade that transported Bantu African slaves from Mozambique to Brazil. By the late 1800s, the Portuguese Empire was one of the greatest political and economic powers in the world. Portuguese-run agricultural plantations started to expand, offering paid labour to the tribal population, yet the Yao increasingly became poor plantation workers under Portuguese rule. However, they preserved their traditional culture and subsistency agriculture. As Muslims, the Yao would not withstand domination by the Portuguese, who forcibly offered them a Christian faith-based education, spoken in the Portuguese language.

At least 450,000 Yao people live in Mozambique. They largely occupy the eastern and northern part of Niassa province, and form about 40% of the population of Lichinga, the province capital. They keep a number of traditions alive, including following the wild greater honeyguide birds to find honey. They will, ultimately, smoke the bees out from the beehive, collect the honey and leave behind the wax for the honeyguide birds, whom relish the treat along with any honeybee larvae they find. A 2016 study of the Yao honey-hunters in northern Mozambique showed that the honeyguides responded to the traditional brrrr-hmm call of the honey-hunters. Hunters learn the call from their fathers and pass it on to their sons. The chances of finding a beehive were greatly increased when hunters used the traditional call. The study also mentions that the Yao consider adult and juvenile honeyguides to be separate species, and hunters report that the former but not the latter responds to the specific honey-hunting call.

Outside Mozambique
The Yao moved into what is now the eastern region of Malawi around the 1830s, when they were active as farmers and traders. Rich in culture, tradition and music, the Yao are primarily Muslim, and count among their famous progeny two former Presidents of the Republic of Malawi, Bakili Muluzi and Joyce Banda. The Yao had close ties with the Swahili on the coast during the late 19th century, and adopted some parts of their culture, such as architecture and religion, but still kept their own national identity. Their close cooperation with the Arabs gave them access to firearms, which gave them an advantage in their many wars against neighbouring peoples, such as the Ngoni and the Chewa. The Yao actively resisted the German forces that were colonizing Southeast Africa (roughly today's Tanzania, Rwanda, and Burundi). A particular example of Yao involvement in the resistance extended to the coastal areas of Kilwa Kivinje, Mikindani and Lindi on the southern coast of Tanzania in 1888, when the German East Africa Company officials attempted to take control of the coastal areas previously under the Sultan of Zanzibar. The Yao continued to defend their lucrative trade route from the Makanjila domains in southern Nyasa to Kilwa Kivinje over the following years, leading to the execution of one of the more prominent raiders, Hassan bin Omari (an associate of the Makanjila), in Kilwa Kivinje in 1895. On the other hand, by 1893, Harry Johnston, with his British forces, was able to declare that he had practically conquered all the Makanjila territory on the shores of Lake Nyasa. In 1890, King Machemba issued a declaration to Commander Hermann von Wissmann, stating that he was open to trade but not willing to submit to German authority. After further engagements, however, the Yao ended up surrendering to German forces. 

In Zimbabwe, the Yaos arrived as immigrants and established a society in Mvurwi under the leadership of the Jalisi clan (also known as Chiteleka or Jalasi). They were among the first to bring Islam to Zimbabwe on the Great Dyke Mountain Pass. The Yao also played a major role in the Maji Maji Rebellion in German East Africa.

Language

The Yao speak a Bantu language known as Chiyao (chi- being the class prefix for "language"), with an estimated 1,000,000 speakers in Malawi, 495,000 in Mozambique, and 492,000 in Tanzania.  The nationality's traditional homeland is located between the Rovuma and the Lugenda Rivers in northern Mozambique. They also speak the official languages of the countries they inhabit, Swahili in Tanzania, Chichewa and Chitumbuka in Malawi, and Portuguese in Mozambique.

Health
Illnesses in Yao culture are believed to originate through physical reasons, curses or by breaking cultural taboos. In such situations where illness is believed to come from the latter two sources (folk illnesses), government health centers will rarely be consulted. Some folk illnesses known to the Yao include undubidwa (an illness affecting breastfeeding children due to jealousy from a sibling), and various "ndaka" illnesses that stem from contact that is made between those who are not sexually active with those who are (cold and hot).

Notable people
 Jacob Wainwright, attendant to David Livingstone
 Bakili Muluzi, Malawian former state president
 Shaaban bin Robert, Tanzanian poet
 Yohanna Barnaba Abdallah, linguist and historian
 Hassan bin Omari or Makunganya, freedom fighter murdered by the Germans in 1895
 Sidi Mubarak Bombay, early Tanzanian explorer

See also
 Dances of the Yao

References

J. Clyde Mitchell, The Yao Village: A Study in the Social Structure of a Malawian Tribe Manchester: Manchester University Press, 1956, 1966, 1971

 
Ethnic groups divided by international borders
Ethnic groups in Malawi
Ethnic groups in Mozambique
Ethnic groups in Tanzania
Indigenous peoples of East Africa